This is a list of yacht clubs in Australia.

Australian Capital Territory
Some yacht clubs in Australian Capital Territory

New South Wales
Some yacht clubs in New South Wales

Sydney area

Regional

Norfolk Island

Northern Territory

Queensland
Some yacht clubs in Queensland

South Australia
Some yacht clubs in South Australia

Tasmania
Some yacht clubs in Tasmania

Victoria
Some yacht clubs in Victoria

Western Australia

Perth area

Regional

See also

List of Australian rules football clubs in Australia
List of baseball teams in Australia
List of rowing clubs in Australia
List of rugby league clubs in Australia
List of rugby union clubs in Australia
List of soccer clubs in Australia
List of yacht clubs

References

External links
Yachting Western Australia

 
Australia
Water transport-related lists
Lists of sports teams in Australia
Lists of sports clubs in Australia